Harvey Reginald MacMillan,  (September 9, 1885 – February 9, 1976) was a Canadian forester, forestry industrialist, wartime administrator, and philanthropist.

Born in Pine Orchard, Whitchurch Township, Ontario (today part of Whitchurch–Stouffville), he attended school in Bogarttown, Sharon, and Aurora. He graduated from the Ontario Agricultural College (then part of the University of Toronto) in 1906 with an honours degree in biology. He obtained a Master of Science degree in Forestry at Yale University in 1908. In 1912, he was appointed first Chief Forester of British Columbia.

In 1919, backed by British timber merchant Montague Meyer, MacMillan established the H.R. MacMillan Export Company, Ltd.

He was Honorary Colonel of the Seaforth Highlanders of Canada from November 23, 1953 to August 7, 1957.

Legacy
MacMillan funded multiple of philanthropic endeavours, many of which were named in his honour. These include:
MacMillan Provincial Park
H. R. MacMillan Space Centre

Bibliography

References

External links
 

1885 births
1976 deaths
Businesspeople from Ontario
Businesspeople from Vancouver
Canadian foresters
Canadian people of Scottish descent
Canadian Commanders of the Order of the British Empire
Companions of the Order of Canada
University of Toronto alumni
People from Whitchurch-Stouffville
Persons of National Historic Significance (Canada)
Ontario Agricultural College alumni
Yale School of Forestry & Environmental Studies alumni